Zarindasht is a small town in Tehran Province, Iran.

Populated places in Tehran Province